Michael Matthias Merzenich (born 1942 in Lebanon, Oregon) is an American neuroscientist and professor emeritus at the University of California, San Francisco. He took the sensory cortex maps developed by his predecessors (Archie Tunturi, Clinton Woolsey, Vernon Mountcastle, Wade Marshall, and Philip Bard) and refined them using dense micro-electrode mapping techniques. Using this, he definitively showed there to be multiple somatotopic maps of the body in the postcentral sulcus, and multiple tonotopic maps of the acoustic inputs in the superior temporal plane.

He led the cochlear implant team at UCSF, which transferred its technology to Advanced Bionics, and their version is the Clarion cochlear implant. He collaborated with Bill Jenkins and Gregg Recanzone to demonstrate sensory maps are labile into adulthood in animals performing operant sensory tasks. He collaborated with Paula Tallal, Bill Jenkins, and Steve Miller to form the company Scientific Learning.  This was based on Fast ForWord software they co-invented that produces improvements in children's language skills that has been related to the magnitude of their temporal processing impairments prior to training.

Merzenich was director and Chief Scientific Officer of Scientific Learning between November 1996 and January 2003.  Merzenich took two sabbaticals from UCSF, in 1997 and 2004.  In 1997 he led research teams at Scientific Learning Corporation, and in 2004 at Posit Science Corporation. Currently, Merzenich's second company, Posit Science Corporation, is working on a broad range of behavioral therapies. Their lead product is a brain-training application called BrainHQ (TM). Merzenich is Chief Scientific Officer, and on the Board of Directors, at Posit Science.

Early life and education
Born in Lebanon, Oregon in 1942, Merzenich grew up fascinated by science. He attended the University of Portland in Portland, Oregon earning his Bachelor of Science in 1964. Here, he was valedictorian, receiving only one non-A, a C in a philosophy course in which he argued with the instructor. In 1968 he earned his PhD in Physiology at Johns Hopkins Medical School in the lab of Vernon Mountcastle, studying neural coding of stimulus magnitude in the hairy skin. He left Johns Hopkins to conduct his postdoctoral studies at the University of Wisconsin under Jerzy Rose. There, he did a cross-species analysis of the cochlear nucleus in large game cats and pinnipeds, did the first auditory cortical microelectrode maps in the macaque with John Brugge, and the first somatosensory maps in the macaque with neurosurgeon Ron Paul. He earned his neurophysiology fellowship between 1968 and 1971. He left Wisconsin to join the faculty at UCSF as the only basic scientist in the clinical Otolaryngology department, head and neck surgery. Merzenich started with UCSF in 1971 as faculty member becoming full professor in 1980.  Merzenich was Co-Director at the Coleman Memorial Laboratory where he conducted research on the cerebral cortex. He was also the Francis A. Sooy Chair of Otolaryngology, in the Keck Center for Integrative Neurosciences at UCSF. His research examines neurological illness, learning processes and the neurological processes of the cerebral cortex.  He remains in the same department, now as a professor emeritus, retiring in 2007.

Research on Brain Plasticity

Merzenich has collaborated in numerous studies researching brain plasticity. In February 2004, Merzenich gave a TED talk titled “Growing evidence of brain plasticity” which outlines the basic findings of his research. Merzenich has helped to identify two distinct periods of brain plasticity: The Critical Period and the period of Adult Plasticity. The Infant Critical Period is when a child’s brain establishes neural processes for the stimuli to which it is presented. The Adult Plasticity period is when the brain refines its neural processes as it masters a variety of tasks.

Understanding how the brain can re-wire itself has allowed Merzenich, Tallal, and other colleagues to develop strategies intended to remediate individuals with any speech, language, and reading deficits. Through research in experience dependent learning with non-human primates, neurophysiologists including Merzenich have demonstrated that neuroplasticity remains through adulthood.
Further studies with monkeys suggested that the Hebbian learning principles that drive neuroplasticity can be used to treat learning-language impaired children.

Dr. James T. Todd, a professor of psychology, has criticized Michael Merzenich for using the term "miraculous" to describe evidence allegedly supporting the rapid prompting method, claiming that scientific outliers are hard to analyze in the laboratory and replicate.  Todd says that it is always important to question scientific outliers.

Awards
In May 1999, Merzenich was honored by election into the National Academy of Sciences for his research on brain plasticity. 

He went on to be elected to the National Academy's Institute of Medicine in 2008, making him one of a very select few to have been elected to more than one of the National Academies. 

As of 2001, he received the Award for Distinguished Scientific Contributions. He has been awarded the International Ipsen Prize, 

 Zülch Prize of the Max-Planck Institute, 

 Thomas Alva Edison Patent Award, 

 The Purkinje Medal, and 

 Karl Spencer Lashley Award. 

In 2015, the National Academy of Engineering awarded Dr. Merzenich the Fritz J. and Dolores H. Russ Prize, the most prestigious award in bioengineering, for his work on cochlear implants.  In 2016 he was awarded one of the world's top neuroscience prizes, the Kavli Prize, for his achievements in the field of brain plasticity.

Merzenich has published more than 200 articles. 

His work is also often covered in the popular press, including The New York Times, The Wall Street Journal, Time and Newsweek. 

He has appeared on Sixty Minutes II, CBS Evening News and Good Morning America. His work has been featured on four PBS specials and the ABC Australia documentary "Redesign My Brain" (which aired on Discovery Channel as "Hack My Brain" in the United States.)

He holds nearly 100 US patents.

Federal grants

Patents and inventions
Merzenich holds nearly 100 U.S. patents. Along with Peter B. Delahunt, Joseph L. Hardy, Henry W. Mahncke, and Donald Richards hold the patent for visual emphasis for cognitive training exercises.  This patent explores a computer system of visual learning.  The participant observes a scene which shows at least one foreground object against a background.  The background or foreground are modified to enhance the participants response to achieve a correct response in an iterative basis.

Published works
Merzenich has contributed to over 232 publications.

Book editor

Further reading
Merzenich, Michael, Soft-Wired: How the New Science of Brain Plasticity Can Change Your Life 
Merzenich, Michael, self-published memoir, A Childhood in the Sticks

See also
 Activity-dependent plasticity
 Brain fitness
 Cognitive neuroscience
 Is Google Making Us Stupid?
 List of members of the National Academy of Sciences (Systems neuroscience)
 Mind and Life Institute
 Timeline of psychology

References

External links
"On the Brain" Dr. Merzenich's blog
Posit Science Corporation
BrainHQ
Scientific Learning Corporation
SCIL – Scientific Learning Corp. At A Glance – Forbes.com
Michael Merzenich: Video "Cortical plasticity underlying human performance abilities; implications for neuro-therapeutics" June 6, 2007
Video: Internet Archive: Details: Michael Merzenich: Brain plasticity  for cochlear implants
Interview: Neuroscience: Neuromodulation, Neuroplasticity and the Reading Brain – Michael Merzenich

1942 births
Living people
Businesspeople from Oregon
American neuroscientists
Members of the United States National Academy of Sciences
University of Portland alumni
Johns Hopkins University alumni
University of Wisconsin–Madison alumni
University of California, San Francisco faculty
American bloggers
American health care businesspeople
American chief executives
People from Lebanon, Oregon
Kavli Prize laureates in Neuroscience
Members of the National Academy of Medicine